The Taipei Representative Office in Singapore (TRO) is the representative office of the Republic of China in Singapore. Its counterpart body in Taiwan is the Singapore Trade Office in Taipei.

The office is located within mTower at 460 Alexandra Road, Singapore.

History
The office was originally established in March 1969 as Trade Mission of the Republic of China, but it adopted its present name in September 1990, following Singapore's establishment of diplomatic relations with the People's Republic of China.

Divisions
 Consular Division
 Information Division
 Economic Division
 Tourism Division

Representatives
Chiang Hsiao-wu
 Vanessa Shih (2009 – May 2012)
 Hsieh Fa-dah (May 2012 – 25 July 2015)
 Jacob Chang (25 July 2015 – 19 May 2016)
 Antonio Chiang (2 August 2016 – 9 August 2016)
 Francis Liang (14 November 2016 –)

Transportation
TRO is accessible within a short walking distance from Labrador Park MRT station.

See also

Singapore–Taiwan relations
List of diplomatic missions of Taiwan
List of diplomatic missions in Singapore
Taipei Economic and Cultural Representative Office

References

Singapore–Taiwan relations
Taiwan
Singapore